Gløshaugen is a neighborhood in the city of Trondheim in Trøndelag county, Norway. It is situated east of the neighborhood of Elgeseter, west of Singsaker, and north of Lerkendal.

Gløshaugen is the site of NTNU Gløshaugen, the main campus and buildings of the Norwegian University of Science and Technology (NTNU). It was the previously the site  of the Norwegian Institute of Technology (NTH) which became a part of the NTNU merger.  Most of the university science and engineering buildings are located at Gløshaugen.

Gallery

References

External links
NTNU Gløshaugen website

Norwegian University of Science and Technology
Geography of Trondheim
University and college campuses in Norway
Neighbourhoods of Trondheim

sv:Norges teknisk-naturvetenskapliga universitet#Gløshaugen